The Skysuites Tower, also known as The Sky Suites Corporate & Residential Towers, is a 38-storey twin building complex under construction in Quezon City. Construction of the building was on hold for a while after its original owner, Globe Asiatique, got involved in a scam. The new owner, DoubleDragon Properties, acquired the building in 2014 and resumed the construction of the building.

Construction
Globe Asiatique commenced the construction of the building then named G.A. Sky Suites, in 2007. Construction of the nearly complete building was put into hold when the G.A. Sky Suites was foreclosed by the Rizal Commercial Banking Corp. (RCBC) in September 2010 after  scam case was filed on Delfin Lee the owner of Globe Asiatique. Lee was accused of devising ghost borrowers to gain  worth of housing loans from Pag-IBIG Fund. The land title of the building was transferred to RCBC in December 2010.

In May 2014, DoubleDragon Properties began efforts to acquire the building from the Rizal Commercial Banking Corporation. Double Dragon announced in September 2014 that it has fully acquired the building after a 90 due diligence period. The building has been renamed as The Sky Suites Corporate & Residential Towers, or simply the Skysuites Tower

Architecture and design
The Skysuites Tower is composed of two 38-storey towers. One of the two towers will be a semi-circular tower for residential use and the other will be a curvilinear tower for office use. The two towers will be connected with a parking and commercial podium.

References

Buildings and structures in Quezon City
Residential skyscrapers in Metro Manila
Buildings and structures under construction in Metro Manila
Skyscraper office buildings in Metro Manila